WYDO (channel 14) is a television station licensed to Greenville, North Carolina, United States, serving as the Fox affiliate for Eastern North Carolina. It is owned by Cunningham Broadcasting, which maintains a shared services agreement (SSA) with Sinclair Broadcast Group, owner of New Bern–licensed ABC affiliate WCTI-TV (channel 12), for the provision of certain services. However, Sinclair effectively owns WYDO as the majority of Cunningham's stock is owned by the family of deceased group founder Julian Smith. Both stations share studios on Glenburnie Drive in New Bern, while WYDO's transmitter is located north of Trenton along NC 41. There is no separate website for WYDO; instead, it is integrated with that of sister station WCTI-TV.

The station's main signal was originally WFXI (channel 8), licensed to Morehead City. WFXI's signal covered the eastern portion of the market, while WYDO served as a full satellite for the western portion. On September 6, 2017, WFXI was shut down as a result of the Federal Communications Commission (FCC)'s spectrum auction, leaving WYDO as the sole Fox affiliate for the region. At the same time, the station was sold by Esteem Broadcasting—an affiliate of WCTI owner Bonten Media Group—to Cunningham Broadcasting, a partner company of Sinclair (which had acquired Bonten).

History

WFXI signed on November 1, 1989, as the area's fourth commercial television station. It immediately assumed the Fox affiliation and aired an analog signal on VHF channel 8. Prior to WFXI's sign-on, residents in the eastern North Carolina area received their Fox programs on cable via Raleigh's WLFL or Washington, D.C.'s Fox owned-and-operated WTTG (both stations were carried as superstations before the network began operations). The station had to operate at considerably lower power than the other stations in this large market because it was short-spaced to both Washington, North Carolina-licensed WITN-TV (channel 7) and Greenville-based WNCT-TV (channel 9). WFXI's signal also had to protect WXEX-TV (now WRIC-TV) in Petersburg, Virginia, which also operated on channel 8. This resulted in a broadcasting radius that only reached the southeastern portions of the Eastern North Carolina designated market area—namely Morehead City, Jacksonville, and New Bern.

As a condition of keeping its Fox affiliation, WFXI signed on full-time satellite WYDO on June 30, 1992. This station aired an analog signal on UHF channel 14 from a transmitter southeast of Ayden that covered Greenville, Washington and the northwestern parts of the Inner Banks region. In addition to resolving reception issues for WFXI, WYDO also provided an additional opportunity for local advertising. While WFXI's studios were always based in Morehead City on Arendell Street/US 70, WYDO operated an advertising sales office in different locations in Greenville (the last one was located on Red Banks Road).

On April 18, 2006, a preliminary announcement was made public stating WFXI and WYDO would each add new second digital subchannels in order to affiliate with MyNetworkTV (a new broadcast network and sister operation to Fox). However, officials later changed their mind, and on August 11, moved the pending affiliation to a secondary arrangement through Ion Television owned-and-operated station WEPX-TV (and its full-time satellite, WPXU-TV). MyNetworkTV is currently seen in the market on a second digital subchannel of NBC outlet WITN-TV. Right now, WYDO-DT2 is affiliated with Bounce TV. For a time, WFXI shared its call sign with a now defunct Class A repeater of a fellow Fox affiliate in Youngstown, Ohio. Although both stations were owned by Piedmont Television until 2007, the two were otherwise unrelated.

On November 6, 2007, it was announced the Federal Communications Commission (FCC) approved the sale of certain WFXI/WYDO assets from Piedmont Television to the Bonten Media Group (owner of WCTI) with the license being sold to Esteem Broadcasting. As part of the deal, WFXI moved from its longtime home to WCTI's facility in New Bern while WYDO closed its sales office. For a while, WFXI's studios in Morehead City continued to be used for a WCTI advertising sales office. In January 2008, after Bonten took over operation of the two stations through a shared services arrangement, they were co-branded together as "Fox Eastern Carolina" and a new logo was made public. The outlets had previously been known on-air as "Fox 8/Fox 14" for many years. The web address remained in that branding until August 2010 when it was integrated into a separate section of WCTI's website.

WFXI/WYDO made local headlines with difficulties transmitting Super Bowl XLII on February 3, 2008. The transmission outage left several thousand viewers unable to watch the game in Eastern North Carolina.

On April 21, 2017, Sinclair announced its intent to purchase the Bonten stations (including WCTI-TV) for $240 million. As an aspect of the deal, the Esteem stations were sold to Sinclair affiliate Cunningham Broadcasting, maintaining the current operational arrangement. The sale was completed September 1.

News operation
In the late-1990s, WFXI/WYDO began airing the market's original prime time newscast that was produced by CBS affiliate WNCT-TV (then owned by Media General) through a news share agreement. Known on-air as Fox News at 10, the broadcast could be seen every night for thirty minutes. It originated from the big three outlet's studios on South Evans Street in Greenville featuring most of WNCT's on-air team (except for maintaining a separate news anchor). The outsourcing arrangement was terminated in December 2007 after WCTI became a sister station to WFXI/WYDO through their management by the Bonten Media Group.

Initially in January 2008, the ABC station began repeating its nightly 6 o'clock show later in the evening at 10 on WFXI/WYDO. It would not be until the month's end when a new live, nightly prime time newscast (produced by WCTI) debuted on this station. Now known as Fox Eastern Carolina News at 10, the show was expanded to an hour on weeknights while remaining a half-hour on weekends. Meanwhile, WNCT began airing its own newscast at 10 on its CW-affiliated subchannel. Unlike the WFXI/WYDO program, WNCT's prime time broadcast only airs for thirty minutes each night.

On June 27, 2010, WCTI became the area's first television outlet to upgrade its local news production to high definition (the nightly news on WFXI/WYDO was included in the change). In addition to the main studios in New Bern, the ABC affiliate operates bureaus in Jacksonville (on South Marine Boulevard/US 17 BUS) and Winterville (covering Greenville). There is no sports department.

Technical information

Subchannels 
The station's digital signal is multiplexed:

Analog-to-digital conversion 
At midnight on June 13, both stations went all-digital as part of the DTV transition.

FCC spectrum sale 
In the FCC's incentive auction, WFXI sold its spectrum for $42,070,860 and indicated that it would go off the air with no channel sharing agreement. On July 30, 2017, WCTI-TV announced that WFXI would shut down on September 6, 2017; WYDO would remain on the air as the market's sole Fox affiliate. Few viewers lost access to Fox programming due to the extremely dense penetration of cable and satellite, which are all but essential for acceptable television in much of this vast market. However, the few viewers in the market's eastern portion who watched WFXI were asked to rescan their sets in order to continue watching Fox.

On October 6, 2017, Cunningham Broadcasting requested the cancellation of the WFXI license.

References

External links

Television channels and stations established in 1992
1992 establishments in North Carolina
YDO
Fox network affiliates
Bounce TV affiliates
Sinclair Broadcast Group